Marcelo Lara (born October 5, 1947) is a former professional tennis player from Mexico. He enjoyed most of his tennis success while playing doubles. During his career, he won two doubles titles.

Career finals

Doubles: 9 (2 titles, 7 runner-ups)

External links
 
 

Mexican male tennis players
Tennis players from Mexico City
Living people
1947 births
Tennis players at the 1967 Pan American Games
Pan American Games medalists in tennis
Pan American Games silver medalists for Mexico
20th-century Mexican people
USC Trojans men's tennis players